Mark Rylance is an English actor known for his work in film, television and theatre.

Filmography

Film

Television

Theatre

Stage

Shakespeare's Globe
Along with Rylance's stage performances, he has appeared often at the Shakespeare's Globe, London.

References

External links
 
 
 Official homepage
 Interview on Farinelli (theatre play), Bridge of Spies etc. Oct-2015
 Interview with Mark Rylance at the Globe on wisdom, Sir Francis Bacon, Shakespeare Jun-94
 Mark Rylance performing the Peacebuilder, Henri Ladyi, Congo
 doollee.com listing of Rylance's works written for the stage 

Male actor filmographies